Baron Horder, of Ashford in the County of Southampton was a title in the Peerage of the United Kingdom. It was created on 23 January 1933 for the leading physician Sir Thomas Horder, 1st Baronet. He had already been created a baronet, of Shaston, in 1923. The titles became extinct on the death of his son, the second Baron, on 30 June 1997.

Barons Horder (1933)
Thomas Jeeves Horder, 1st Baron Horder (1871–1955)
Thomas Mervyn Horder, 2nd Baron Horder (1910–1997)

Arms

Notes

References
Kidd, Charles, Williamson, David (editors). Debrett's Peerage and Baronetage (1990 edition). New York: St Martin's Press, 1990, 

Extinct baronies in the Peerage of the United Kingdom
Noble titles created in 1933